CRA is an abbreviation for:

Companies

 Conestoga-Rovers & Associates, a consulting engineering firm in Waterloo, Ontario, Canada
 Convenience Retail Asia, Hong Kong
 Conzinc Riotinto of Australia
 CRA International, a consultancy

Credit reporting

 Credit bureau, known as consumer reporting agency (CRA) in the US, and credit rating agency (CRA) in the UK

Job titles

 Certified Research Administrator
 Clinical research associate or Clinical Research Assistant in clinical trial
 Commander, Royal Artillery

Laws

 Civil Rights Act (disambiguation), multiple parts of US legislation
 Community Reinvestment Act of 1977 (US)
 Congressional Review Act of 1996 (US)
 Constitution Restoration Act of 2004/2005
 Cyber Resilience Act, a regulation proposed in September 2022 by the EU

Organizations

Australia
 Christian Research Association
 Commercial Radio Australia, the peak body for commercial radio

Canada
 Canada Revenue Agency, administering tax laws

Colombia
 Potable Water and Basic Sanitation Regulation Commission

Singapore
 Casino Regulatory Authority of Singapore, a statutory board regulating casinos

United Kingdom
 Cambridgeshire Rowing Association

United States
 Congress of Russian Americans, Russian émigré organization
 Champion Racing Association, auto racing sanctioning body
 Community redevelopment agency, urban renewal body
 Computing Research Association, academic department association
 Corn Refiners Association, trade association
 Critical Research Academy, a  College of Education graduate program
 California Republican Assembly
 California Roadster Association, a racing governing body

Other 
 Community reinforcement approach to therapy for addiction
 Corona Australis (CrA), a constellation in the Southern Hemisphere